William Smith (23 June 1887 – 21 March 1929) was an English professional footballer who played at centre-forward for various clubs in the years immediately prior to the First World War.

Football career
Smith was born in Denaby Main, in the West Riding of Yorkshire and played his early football for the nearby Hickleton Main Colliery, before joining Brentford of the Southern League in October 1912. At Griffin Park, he soon gained a reputation as a prolific goal-scorer with 12 goals from 27 appearances.

In the 1913 close-season, he moved to the south coast to join Southampton and made his debut for the "Saints" in the opening match of the 1913–14 season. Despite "showing persistence and industry", he struggled to reproduce the form he had at Brentford and after scoring only four goals in his first fourteen appearances, he was replaced by Percy Prince. Smith was recalled for a further five matches in December/January without managing to score, and lost his place again, this time to new signing, Arthur Hollins.

In the summer of 1914, Smith returned to Yorkshire to join Halifax Town of the Midland League.

References

1887 births
People from Conisbrough
Footballers from Doncaster
English footballers
Association football forwards
Brentford F.C. players
Southampton F.C. players
Halifax Town A.F.C. players
Southern Football League players
1929 deaths